The elm cultivar Ulmus × hollandica 'Odin' is one of five miniature or bonsai cultivars from the Elegantissima Group raised by the Gartneriet Vestdal nursery in Odense, Denmark.

Description
'Odin' is distinguished by its light-green leaves and their irregular margins.

Nurseries

Europe

Gartneriet Vestdal , Odense, Denmark.

Dutch elm cultivar
Ulmus articles missing images
Ulmus